Troublemaker, The Troublemaker, Trouble Maker, or Trouble Makers may refer to:

Film
 Troublemaker Studios, a Texan film production company founded by Robert Rodriguez and Elizabeth Avellan
 Trouble Makers (1917 film), a lost silent film drama
 The Troublemaker (1924 film), a Spanish silent film
 Trouble Makers (1948 film), an American film
 The Troublemaker (1950 film), a Spanish musical comedy film 
 The Troublemaker (1963 film), a Spanish musical film
 The Troublemaker (1964 film), a film by Theodore J. Flicker
 Trouble-Maker (film), a 1964 Canadian drama film
 The Troublemaker (1969 film), a Spanish musical film
 Troublemakers (1994 film), a Western comedy film
 Trouble Maker (film), a 1995 Taiwan and Hong Kong romance comedy film
 The Trouble-Makers, a 2003 Hong Kong film 
 Trouble Makers (2006 film), a Chinese film
 Troublemakers (2015 film), a documentary film by James Crump

Literature
 Troublemaker: Surviving Hollywood and Scientology, a 2015 book by Leah Remini
 Troublemaker: Let's Do What It Takes to Make America Great Again, a 2011 book by Christine O'Donnell
 Troublemaker, a 2011 book by Andrew Clements

Music
 The Troublemaker (zarzuela), a Spanish zarzuela (opera)
 Trouble Maker (duo), a South Korean music duo
 Troublemakers (French band), an electronic music band
 Troublemakers (Swedish band), a punk rock bank

Albums
 Troublemaker (album), a 1979 album by Ian McLagan
 The Troublemaker (album), a 1976 album by Willie Nelson
 Trouble Maker (album), a 2017 album by Rancid
 Trouble Maker (EP), a 2011 EP by Trouble Maker

Songs
 "Troublemaker" (Akon song) (2008)
 "Troublemaker" (Arashi song) (2010)
 "Trouble Maker" (Trouble Maker song) (2011)
 "Troublemaker" (Taio Cruz song) (2011)
 "Trouble-Maker" (song), a 1976 song by Roberta Kelly
 "Troublemaker" (Olly Murs song) (2012)
 "Troublemaker" (Weezer song) (2008)
 "Trouble Maker", a 1976 song by Hummingbird
 "Trouble Maker", a 1969 song by Johnny Darrell

Other uses
 Trouble Maker (car), an American gasser driven by Joe Lunati
 Troublemaker, an American harness racing horse that won the 1984 Messenger Stakes
 Troublemaker, a 2014 Showtime Dane Cook comedy special